Ondokuzmayıs is a district of Samsun Province of Turkey. The mayor is Osman Topaloğlu (AKP).

References

Populated places in Samsun Province
Districts of Samsun Province